Paul N. Franco (born 1956) is a professor of government at Bowdoin College in Brunswick, Maine, and a leading authority on the British political philosopher Michael Oakeshott.

Franco holds a B.A. from Colorado College, where he studied under Oakeshott scholar Timothy Fuller, an M.Sc. from the London School of Economics, where he studied under Oakeshott himself, and a Ph.D. from the University of Chicago, where his advisor was Joseph Cropsey, a friend and disciple of the political philosopher Leo Strauss. Before Bowdoin, he taught at the University of Chicago as a William Rainey Harper Fellow.

Fuller called his book, The Political Philosophy of Michael Oakeshott (1990) the "only complete and current exposition" of Oakeshott so far. In The Conservative Soul, Fundamentalism, Freedom, and the Future of the Right (2006) blogger Andrew Sullivan referred to Franco as one of Oakeshott's "most insightful students." Franco's attempt to restore Hegel's place as an enlightenment philosopher Hegel's Philosophy of Freedom (2002) addresses a growing emphasis on Hegel's romanticism and historicism. Franco's Hegel book is now generally read alongside the work of other eminent Hegel scholars such as Robert Pippin, Charles Taylor, Steven Smith, and Alexandre Kojève. Franco's current work focuses on Friedrich Nietzsche's middle works.

Franco's articles and reviews have appeared in The American Political Science Review, Political Theory, The Journal of Politics, The Review of Politics, Political Studies, Ethics, and The Political Science Reviewer.

Political philosophy
The Problem of Culture: Professor Franco delivered the Karofsky Lecture at Bowdoin College on September 6, 2007. His lecture was entitled "Friedrich Nietzsche and Liberal Education" and in it he formulates the "Problem of Culture:"

We have seen that Nietzsche’s fundamental solution to the problem was to posit the production of great human being or geniuses as the goal of education. Such a goal he thought would provide unity to an otherwise fragmentary culture, and meaning to the otherwise egoistic lives of individuals. It is in many ways a beguiling solution, but it is also deeply at odds with the fundamental presuppositions of 21st century American democracy. For this reason, it ultimately fails to carry conviction. Even Nietzsche himself changed his mind about the nature of the goal to be aimed at and his later philosophy is littered with figures, free-spirits, supermen, new philosophers, who were meant to fill the role originally attributed to the genius. Perhaps this is one of Nietzsche’s most enduring lessons—not his specific solutions he came up with, but the tireless quest to find a goal for culture and education in a world that had lost its traditional bearings, and was headed into the long twilight of nihilism. Though he may not have discovered a goal that we find compelling today, he brings home the danger, especially for education, of doing without any goal at all" Freedom after the Cold War: Franco's work on Hegel seeks to overcome the dichotomy between positive and negative liberty as articulated by western political thinkers like Isaiah Berlin during the cold war.Societas and universitas: These two poles anchor Franco's thought. The former, as expressed by Oakeshott, refers to a "band of eccentrics" bound together by no common purposes. Universitas refers to a political order conceived as a people consecrated to a collective enterprise. Franco's work on Oakeshott leans towards the Societas understanding of politics whereas his recent works on Nietzsche lean towards a universitas conception of politics. He does not seem to think these two are mutually exclusive. One could say his project is trying to reconcile universitas and liberalism for the 21st century.

BooksThe Political Philosophy of Michael Oakeshott (Yale, 1990)Hegel's Philosophy of Freedom (Yale, 1999)Michael Oakeshott: An Introduction (Yale, 2004)Adventures of a Free Spirit: Nietzsche's Trilogy from the Middle Period'' (forthcoming, Chicago, 2011)

References

1956 births
Living people
Governmental studies academics
American political writers
American male non-fiction writers
Bowdoin College faculty
Alumni of the London School of Economics